Campénéac is a commune in the Morbihan department of Brittany in north-western France. Inhabitants of Campénéac are called in French Campénéacois.

References

External links

Mayors of Morbihan Association 

Communes of Morbihan